Brownsville Road is a road between Pittsburgh, at Eighteenth Street and South Avenue in Allegheny County, Pennsylvania eastwards through Mount Oliver and generally highlands situated along or near the hilltops  often overlooking (and sometimes taking shorter paths cutting across the loops of the meanders of) the Monongahela River. It has had several names over its history, and was also known at the Red Stone Road and the period it was a Plank Road managed as a toll road, the Brownsville Plank Road, or the Brownsville Turnpike, or locally, as the area grew into a city, Southern Avenue.
 
Along its route, it would also travel through Westmoreland County and end at its start terminus in Brownsville, Fayette County, Pennsylvania. It was a heavily used emigrant trail during the post-Revolutionary War surge in expansion west over the Allegheny Ridge to settle the now safer, now open lands of the Northwest Territory until well into the 1850s as an westward emigrant trail.

Pre-history to the 19th century
It later became the road connecting Pittsburgh with Brownsville, Pennsylvania, and from there via Nemacolin's Path to Virginia and points further east and further West to a similar crossing at present-day Wheeling, West Virginia. Brownsville was attractive as a point on the Eastern Emigrant Trails where travelers could reach river boat construction on the water levels of the Mississippi watershed—or continue across Washington County on the wagon roads westward to cross the (West) Virginia pan handle to reach lower central Ohio and points west.
 
It was a major route for travel by stagecoach and emigrants driving Conestoga Wagons to Northern Ohio (often via Youngstown, Ohio WNW of Pittsburgh or Northwestwards for the lower side of the Great Lakes. Whatever the destination, at least one crossing of the Allegheny and Youghiogheny Rivers was needed for travelers proceeding west on northern roads.). The road was also significant during the Whiskey Rebellion, particularly its southern half; when trans-Allegheny farmers rose in armed protest to a tax on liquor sent east by pack animal on the Cumberland-Brownsville Road—shipping distilled liquor was easier than shipping the much greater volume and weight of raw grains.

19th century
It was the route along which telegraph lines first entered Pittsburgh. There are relatively few roads connecting the floodplain of the Monongahela River with the higher elevations to the south and west of the river. Originally, Brownsville road connected with the floodplain by the road now known as Arlington Avenue. In 1851 a turnpike company was chartered by the State of Pennsylvania to pave the Pittsburgh end of the road, and to connect it with South Eighteenth Street. After this construction, the northern end of Brownsville Road connected to S. Eighteenth Street at the crossing of the Pittsburgh, Virginia and Charleston Railway. Many cemeteries were sited along the road as part of the Rural Cemetery Movement. In the 1880s, an "electric road" was built from Mount Oliver to the Concord Presbyterian Church, an area of Carrick also known as Crailo or Spiketown. Brownsville Road became a route out of the city for amusement and entertainment, including prize fighting.

20th century
Streetcar tracks of the Pittsburgh Railways Co. ran down the road until 1971, ending just past the border of Pittsburgh at the "Brentwood Loop". They were part of the 53 Carrick, the 53's rush-hour variant 47 Carrick via Tunnel, and the 77/54 North Side–Carrick via Bloomfield ("Flying Fraction"), streetcar runs.

Notes

References

Streets in Pittsburgh
Transportation in Allegheny County, Pennsylvania
Transportation in Fayette County, Pennsylvania
Historic trails and roads in Pennsylvania